Jewell Ridge is an unincorporated community in Tazewell County, Virginia, United States. Jewell Ridge has a post office with ZIP code 24622.

References

Unincorporated communities in Tazewell County, Virginia
Unincorporated communities in Virginia
Coal towns in Virginia